Henry Ferguson may refer to:
 Henry Ferguson (politician) (died 1777), politician in Nova Scotia
 Harry Ferguson (1884–1960), Irish engineer and inventor
 Harry Ferguson (footballer), Scottish footballer
 Henry Ferguson (painter) (1665–1730), or Vergazon, Dutch painter
 Henry Augustus Ferguson (1842–1911), American landscape painter
 Henry G. Ferguson (1882–1996), American geologist
 Henry Lindo Ferguson (1858–1948), New Zealand ophthalmologist, university professor and medical school dean